The Himalayan shrew (Soriculus nigrescens) is a species of shrew in the subfamily Soricinae (red-toothed shrews) and tribe Nectogalini. It is found in Bhutan, China, India, Myanmar, and Nepal, and is the only extant species in the genus Soriculus.

References

Hutterer, R. 2005. Order Soricomorpha. Pp. 220–311 in Wilson, D.E. and Reeder, D.M. (eds.). Mammal Species of the World: a taxonomic and geographic reference. 3rd ed. Baltimore: The Johns Hopkins University Press, 2 vols., 2142 pp. 

 
Mammals of Nepal
Taxonomy articles created by Polbot
Mammals described in 1842